Red Sindhi cattle are the most popular of all Zebu dairy breeds.  The breed originated in the Sindh province of Pakistan, they are widely kept for milk production across Pakistan, India, Bangladesh, Sri Lanka, and other countries. Their milk production is about 12 to 15 kg per day They have been used for crossbreeding with temperate (European) origin dairy breeds in many countries to combine their tropical adaptations (heat tolerance, tick resistance, disease resistance, fertility at higher temperatures, etc.) with the higher milk production found in temperate regions.  It has been crossed with Jerseys in many places, including India, the United States, Australia, Sri Lanka, etc.

Description
The Red Sindhi range in color from a deep reddish brown to a yellowish red, but most commonly a deep red.  They are distinguished from the other dairy breed of Sindh, the Tharparkar or White Sindhi, both by color and form, the Red Sindhi is smaller, rounder, with a more typical dairy form, and with short, curved horns, while the Tharparkar are taller with a shape more typical of Zebu draft breeds, and with longer, lyre shaped horns. The bulls are usually of a darker color than the cows.

Breeding
It has been crossed with include Holstein-Friesian, Brown Swiss and Danish Red.  It has also been used to improve beef and dual purpose cattle in many tropical countries, as it is sufficiently meaty to produce good beef calves in such crosses and the high milk production helps give a fast-growing calf which is ready for market at one year.  It is somewhat smaller than the very similar Sahiwal and produces a little less milk per animal as a result.  This has caused it to lose favor with some commercial dairies in India and Pakistan, which have been phasing out their Red Sindhi herds by breeding to Sahiwal bulls for a few generations. The resulting cows, which are three-quarters Sahiwal and one-quarter Red Sindhi, can not be distinguished from pure Sahiwal cattle. 
Red Sindhi cattle are also used for milk production in Brazil, but this race of zebu is not popular as others.

Brazilian Red Sindhi Cattle
Some Red Sindhi cows were imported to the Brazil in the middle of  20th century.

See also
 Tharparkar cattle
 Sahiwal cattle
 Zebu

References

External links
 STATUS, CHARACTERISTICS AND PERFORMANCE OF RED SINDHI CATTLE

Cattle breeds
Cattle breeds originating in Pakistan
Animal breeds originating in Sindh
Red cattle
Cattle breeds originating in India